Phil or Phil(l)ip Hunt may refer to:

Phillip Hunt (born 1986), American football player
Philip Hunt, politician
Philip Hunt (priest) (1772–1838), English Anglican priest and antiquarian
Phil Hunt (1884–1946), Australian rules footballer